Thomas Healy may refer to:

Thomas Healy (politician) (1894–1957), Liberal party member of the Canadian House of Commons
Thomas F. Healy (1931–2004), U.S. Army general
Tom Healy (hurler) (1855–?), Irish hurler
Tom Healy (poet) (born 1961), American poet
Thomas Joseph Healy, Member of Parliament for North Wexford, 1891–1900
Thomas Healy (baseball) (1895–1977), Major League Baseball player for Philadelphia Athletics

See also
Tom Healey (1853–1891), American Major League Baseball player
Thomas J. Healey (born 1942), academic at Harvard University’s John F. Kennedy School of Government
Tom Healy (disambiguation)